Pseudonaclia is a genus of moths in the subfamily Arctiinae. The genus was erected by Arthur Gardiner Butler in 1876.

Species
 Pseudonaclia bifasciata Aurivillius, 1909
 Pseudonaclia fasciata Gaede, 1926
 Pseudonaclia puella Boisduval, 1847

References

Arctiinae